The Nandi Award for Best Story Writer was commissioned since 1965:

References

Story Writer